The 2017 AFC Champions League group stage was played from 20 February to 10 May 2017. A total of 32 teams competed in the group stage to decide the 16 places in the knockout stage of the 2017 AFC Champions League.

Draw

The seeding of each team in the draw was determined by their association and their qualifying position within their association. The mechanism of the draw was as follows:
For the West Region, a draw was held for the three associations with three direct entrants (United Arab Emirates, Saudi Arabia, Iran) to determine the seeds 1 placed in order for Groups A, B and C. The remaining teams were then allocated to the groups according to the rules set by AFC.
For the East Region, a draw was held for the two associations with three direct entrants (South Korea, Japan) to determine the seeds 1 placed in order for Groups E and F. The remaining teams were then allocated to the groups according to the rules set by AFC.

The following 32 teams entered into the group stage draw, which included the 24 direct entrants and the eight winners of the play-off round of the qualifying play-offs, whose identity were not known at the time of the draw.

Format

Tiebreakers

Schedule
The schedule of each matchday was as follows. Matches in the West Region were played on Mondays and Tuesdays, while matches in the East Region were played on Tuesdays and Wednesdays.

Groups

Group A

Group B

Group C

Group D

Group E

Group F

Group G

Group H

Notes

References

External links
, the-AFC.com
AFC Champions League 2017, stats.the-AFC.com

2
February 2017 sports events in Asia
March 2017 sports events in Asia
April 2017 sports events in Asia
May 2017 sports events in Asia